Now (Nearly) 36 is the twenty-third studio album by King Creosote. It was released in 2003 on Fence Records.

Track listing
The Donaldsons       
Talking Again       
Over The Top       
Musakal Lives       
Going Gone       
Matty Groves       
Steal Away       
Monsigneur

References
King Creosote – Now (Nearly) 36

2003 albums
King Creosote albums